Giovanni Francesco Malagodi (12 October 1904 – 17 April 1991) was an Italian liberal politician, secretary of the Italian Liberal Party (Partito Liberale Italiano; PLI), and president of the Italian Senate.

He was the third and sixth President of the Liberal International, in the periods 1958–1966 and 1982–1989 respectively.

Biography
Born in London, he was the son of journalist and politician Olindo Malagodi. Starting from the 1930s, he held directive positions in the Banca Commerciale Italiana, and was thus named as Italian representative of the Organisation for European Economic Co-operation (OEEC) soon after the Second World War.

In 1953 Malagodi entered the Italian Liberal Party, and was appointed as the party's national secretary the following year. During his tenure, the PLI abandoned its historic identification with the Risorgimento and instead established strong ties with Confindustria, the country's leading association of industrialists. He also opposed attempts by the Christian Democrats to form a centre-left alliance with the Italian Socialist Party in government; this, in 1955, caused the secession of the PLI's left wing, which went on to form the Radical Party. Under Malagodi, in 1963 the PLI scored a record 7% in that year's general election.

With the formation of centre-left governments in the 1960s, the PLI was marginalized in the Italian political world, and suffered a decline that was not halted by the party's participation in the second Giulio Andreotti cabinet of 1972–1973. Malagodi was chosen as Minister of the Treasury in that government, launching a series of measures that favoured younger and more politically-aligned bureaucrats, such as the so-called pensioni d'oro ("Golden pensions").

In 1972 Malagodi resigned as secretary of the PLI, assuming the party's presidency that same year. He abandoned this latter position in 1976 after coming into conflict with Valerio Zanone, the new leader of the PLI, who was more oriented towards a collaboration with centre-left parties. Malagodi was the president of the Italian Senate from 22 April to 1 July 1987, succeeding Amintore Fanfani.

Between 1954 and 1965, Malagodi participated in several Bilderberg conferences. He died in Rome in April 1991.

External links
Profile at Italian Senate 

Presidents of the Italian Senate
Presidents of the Liberal International
1904 births
1991 deaths
Italian Liberal Party politicians
20th-century Italian politicians
British emigrants to Italy